The Joe Shuster Story: The Artist Behind Superman is a graphic novel written by Julian Voloj and illustrated by Thomas Campi. It is the first graphic novel biography focusing on Superman co-creator Joe Shuster. The book was originally published in Italian and then translated into English.

Reception
The Jewish Book Council said that "The Joe Shuster Story is a tale of unbridled aspiration in a world beset with the cruelties of reality". Publishers Weekly said that the book's art "lends warmth and beauty to this elegy to two kids chewed up by a system that sees dollar signs and goes in for the kill." The Comics Journal called it a "meticulously researched graphic biography" that is "smartly visualized in understated, softly painted Edward Hopper-esque images."

See also 
 Boys of Steel, a picture book biography of Siegel and Shuster by Marc Tyler Nobleman and Ross MacDonald

References

External links
The Joe Shuster Story at Super Genius Comics
Joe Shuster: La storia degli uomini che crearono Superman at Bao Publishing

2018 graphic novels
American biographies
Italian graphic novels
Non-fiction graphic novels